The DoubleTree by Hilton Grand Hotel Biscayne Bay, also referred as The Grand or The Grand DoubleTree, is a high-rise on the north side of Downtown Miami, Florida, United States. It lies within the Arts & Entertainment District. It was completed in 1986 and designed by the Atlanta architectural firm of Toombs, Amisano and Wells. It is a condominium and hotel.  Floors 3–9 are hotel rooms.  Floors 10–42 contain over 830 condominium units.  The hotel portion contains 152 rooms, and was renovated in 2004. The building is very large, with almost  of floor space, though this likely includes a large parking garage across the street that is shared with the Omni complex.

It is a full-service building, meaning it contains offices, a grocery store, convenience store, deli, clothing stores, gift shops, jewelry stores, pet store, pharmacy, bank, car rental office, doctor, dentist, beauty salon, barbershop, liquor store, dry cleaner, four restaurants, full-time concierge, valet, day spa, fitness center, pool, hot tubs, banquet halls and a full-service marina.

It is located one block north of the Adrienne Arsht Metromover station, and two blocks northeast of Miami's performing arts center.  It is directly east of, and connected by skywalk to the Omni International Mall. Its backyard is the Sea Isle Marina, home to the Miami International Boat Show.

The condominium floors of the building have two large atriums on the east and west side.

Restaurants on site
Tony Chan's Water Club
Primo's Restaurant & Lounge
 Los Gauchitos Steakhouse
Casablanca Sea Food

Gallery

See also
List of tallest buildings in Miami
Omni International Mall

External links
Doubletree Biscayne Bay – Emporis.com

References

Residential buildings completed in 1986
DoubleTree hotels
Skyscraper hotels in Miami
1986 establishments in Florida
Hotel buildings completed in 1986